Young Footballer of the Year may refer to:

 All Stars Young Footballer of the Year, an annual award presented to a Gaelic football player in Ireland
 PFA Young Player of the Year, an annual award presented to an association football player in England

See also
 All Stars Young Hurler of the Year, a similar award presented to a hurler each year